The flag of Fort Wayne, Indiana, was adopted as the city's official flag by City Council on June 26, 1934. The pall design includes two diagonal white stripes (from the bottom left and top left corners) converging in the circular center to form a horizontal white stripe. Red silhouettes of a Miami Native American head (center left), a French fleur-de-lis (top right), and a British lion (bottom right) grace a navy blue field. A red blockhouse is located at the center of the converging stripes, with the settlement's founding date and city name.

History
In commemoration of Indiana's centennial festivities in 1916, the Journal Gazette sponsored a contest to design a flag for the city of Fort Wayne. Guy Drewett's original winning design included the current white 'Y' stripes on a blue field, but also included two white stars. Each star was located where the fleur-de-lis and lion are on the current design.

Drewett redesigned the flag in 1934 under the guidance of veteran and historian Col. Clyde Dreisbach in 1934. The new design discarded the two white stars (symbolizing Fort Wayne's status as the state's second largest city) for icons specific to its history. This current design was officially adopted by City Council on June 26, 1934.

A survey of flag design quality by the North American Vexillological Association ranked Fort Wayne's flag 52nd of 150 American city flags. It earned a score 4.62 out of 10.

Symbolism
Blockhouse: Symbolizes pioneer days of settlement
Miami Indian head: Representing the Miami tribe (native inhabitants to the area)
French fleur-de-lis: Represents former French control and influence on the area
British lion: Represents former British control and influence on the area
Three stripes: Symbolizing confluence of the three rivers in the city; Maumee River, St. Joseph River, and St. Marys River
Colors: Red, white, and blue, identical to the colors represented on the flag of the United States
1794: Founding of Fort Wayne

References

External links
City of Fort Wayne Code §1-11

Government of Fort Wayne, Indiana
Culture of Fort Wayne, Indiana
History of Fort Wayne, Indiana
Fort Wayne
Fort Wayne
1934 establishments in Indiana
Flags displaying animals